The Postgraduate Institute of Agriculture (PGIA) of the University of Peradeniya is a graduate school that provides trained scientific personnel for the agricultural sector. It was established in 1975. The institution functions as a semi-autonomous unit within the University of Peradeniya. The PGIA offers three degree programmes, M.Sc., M.Phil. and Ph.D/DBA. It has awarded 40 Ph.D., 261 M.Phil., 1019 M.Sc. and 35 MBA degrees since its inception.

Programs

Agricultural biology
M.Sc. in Biotechnology
M.Sc. in Biology

Agricultural economics
Postgraduate Diploma in Development Practice Management
M.Sc. in Agricultural Economics (By Course Work)
M.Sc. in Environmental Economics (By Course Work)
M.Sc. in Natural Resource Management (By Course Work)
M. Phil. in Agricultural Economics (By Course Work and Research)
M. Phil. in Agricultural Economics (By Research)
Ph.D. in Agricultural Economics (By Course Work and Research)
Ph.D. in Agricultural Economics (By Research)

Agricultural engineering
M.Sc. in Integrated Water Resources Management (IWRM)
M.Sc. in Agricultural and Biosystems Engineering
M.Sc. in Geoinformatics

Agricultural extension
M.Sc. in Organizational Management
M.Sc. in Development Communication and Extension

Animal Science
M.Sc. in Animal Science
M.Sc. in Poultry Science and Technology
M.Sc. in Dairy and Meat Product Technology
M.Sc. in Aquatic Bio-resources Management and Aquaculture

Business administration
Degree Programme in Master of Business Administration (MBA)
Degree Programme in Doctor of Business Administration (DBA)
Degree Programme in Doctor of Philosophy (Ph.D.)

Crop science
M.Sc. in Crop Science
M.Sc. in Environmental Forestry
M.Sc. in Floriculture and Landscape Architecture
M.Sc in Tropical Agriculture (By Course Work and Research)

Food science and technology
M.Sc. in Food Science and Technology
M.Sc. in Food and Nutrition

Plant protection
M.Sc. in Plant Protection Technology
M.Sc. in Molecular and Applied Microbiology

Soil science
M.Sc. in Tropical Soil Management
M.Sc. in Environmental Soil Science
M.Sc. in Soil and Environmental Microbiology

References

External links
Official website

University of Peradeniya
Graduate schools in Sri Lanka